Selahattin Kılıçsallayan (born 18 October 1993) is a Turkish freestyle wrestler. At the 2018 Mediterranean Games held in Tarragona, Spain, he won the gold medal in the men's 65 kg event.

Career 
In 2019, Kılıçsallayan won the silver medal in the 65 kg event at the European Wrestling Championships held in Bucharest, Romania. In that same year, he also won one of the bronze medals in the 65 kg event at the 2019 Military World Games held in Wuhan, China.

In March 2021, he competed at the European Qualification Tournament in Budapest, Hungary hoping to qualify for the 2020 Summer Olympics in Tokyo, Japan.

Major results

References

External links 
 

Living people
1993 births
Sportspeople from Kahramanmaraş
Turkish male sport wrestlers
Mediterranean Games medalists in wrestling
Mediterranean Games gold medalists for Turkey
Competitors at the 2018 Mediterranean Games
European Wrestling Championships medalists
European Games competitors for Turkey
Wrestlers at the 2019 European Games
21st-century Turkish people